Phoenix Mountain is a small ski resort in the Boundary Country in southern British Columbia, between the towns of Greenwood and Grand Forks.  It is a community owned ski hill. There is a lodge with a cafeteria, a rental shop and a terrain park. Phoenix ski hill has one T-Bar and one Rope Tow.  There are 16 designated runs with 18 marked trails, and a dedicated trail for terrain and big air.

See also
Grand Forks, British Columbia
Greenwood, British Columbia
Phoenix, British Columbia
List of ski areas and resorts in Canada

External links
Phoenix Mountain Website
Phoenix Mountain Trail Map

References

Boundary Country
Ski areas and resorts in British Columbia